Aminopeptidase Y (aminopeptidase Co, aminopeptidase (cobalt-activated), lysyl aminopeptidase) is an enzyme. This enzyme catalyses the following chemical reaction

 Preferentially, release of N-terminal lysine

This enzyme requires Co2+. It is inhibited by Zn2+ and Mn2+.

References

External links 
 

EC 3.4.11